Immersive theater differentiates itself from traditional theater by removing the stage and immersing audiences within the performance itself. Often, this is accomplished by using a specific location (site-specific), allowing audiences to converse with the actors and interact with their surroundings (interactive), thereby breaking the fourth wall. (Immersive theater and interactive theater are not necessarily synonymous; immersive theater may not have interactive elements in it at all, and interactive theater may not be immersive in the core sense.)

In choose-your-own-adventure theater, agency is given to the audience to participate in changing the narrative while the performance is taking place. Bespoke theater, invented by Fondudes, extends participation to pre-production so each show is customized per audience at script level. Modern forms of immersive theater have a wide range of definitions, all based upon the degree and type of engagement found between actors and their audience. There has been considerable debate among critics concerning these definitions of interaction, at the heart of which are concepts such as audience influence, participation, social constructs and roles, and involvement, all depending on the degree of involvement needed for the works progression. Although many critics argue that all art incorporates a certain level of collaboration between its creator and its viewer, immersive theater differs in that audience members are expected to play some level of an active role in the creative process of the work. Immersive theater can take many forms depending on the degree of involvement of the audience, ranging from open acknowledgment of the audience's presence, to the audience's complete freedom of choice in determining the narrative.

Interactivity in immersive theater is most successful when the appropriate balance of creative freedom of the audience members and narrative structures placed upon them exists.

Context
Scholarly analysis of immersive theater is often Eurocentric: three main steps are often identified for creating an immersive and participatory theater experience:

 Disintegration of the barrier between audience and actors
 Placement of audience members into the narrative of the work
 Removal of social structures dividing known constructs from imagined ones/lack of constructs.

One way immersion and interaction is achieved is through the use of "polychronic narrative". This is a narrative in which the participant does not play a main role, as placing them in that position would involve too much volatility and freedom, preventing the telling of a structured story. Instead, the participant is given certain prescribed moments of actions and input. These moments do affect the narrative, but do so in a manner that is more impactful on the participant than any other aspect of the play. Participants are encouraged to be a part of the play, but not a deciding factor. Another way to achieve immersion is by using the word "you" when addressing the participant. This allows for the assigned role within the play to mesh with the actual social role of the participant, blurring the lines of reality. It also allows for a certain amount of ambiguity, as specific attributes such as age, gender, and profession are left unaddressed, and open to relative interpretation. The use of suspense and anxiety can be used to guide an individual participant through a narrative. By removing the participant from their comfort zone, their actions and reactions become influenced by both their instincts and the prompts given to them by the actors. This is used to attain believable reactions from a participant, in addition to maintaining order and structure needed to advance a storyline.

Immersive plays use different types of environments, from large multi-leveled buildings to open areas.  The different environments enhance the audience's involvement in the play, by giving them choices of how they want to participate in the theater. Inside the different personalized spaces, the audience can move from room to room. In some immersive plays the interiors can be set up on different levels, where each room can be an entirely different scene of the play.  Rooms can be dark, bright, colorful, cold, warm, scented, and crammed in order to accomplish an ambiance desired by the actors. By using light colors which correspond to specific emotions, the actors can capture spectators moods before a word is spoken or movement executed. Space is a powerful tool wielded by the actors in order to change audience's point of views.

According to many theater theorists, four major components make the audience feel more integrated into theater performances: "real space," sense, movement, and time. "Real Space" is a component of immersive theater, and actual space is a part of the staged play. If the play is set in a castle, audiences would go to real castle and have people watch it there in order for them to get feeling of being immersed in the theatrical performance. Engaging the senses, such as blindfolding the audience, can heighten the sense of hearing sound. Movement can affect how audiences perceive plot—moving around the theater space immerses the kinesthetic sense. A sense of time can be engaged by creating a sense of time that precedes and post-dates the play.

Examples

Teen Interactive Theater Education 
The Teen Interactive Theater Education (TITE) program was established in 2007 to measure the level of decision-making skills and adolescent risk behaviors. The TITE program uses performance, role play and peer education to educate youth on making healthier decision. TITE youth participants do several educational performances to deliver information to youth. Teen participants teach other teens about risk prevention through performances. Lessons include the importance of avoiding risky behaviors, improving risk-avoidance skills and knowledge of the consequences of risky behaviors. The objective is to help youth understand risks and the positive effects of decision-making skills. Theater provides participating youth with immersive experience focusing on "team building activities, experimental learning opportunities which will contribute in developing life skills, critical thinking, relationships and values." A total of 127 students participated and result found that most students reported an increase in knowledge, abilities and belief due to intervention; some reported less overall learning. Research shows that this program can reduce youth risk behavior to improve overall decision-making skills for youth participants, and improve the way the youth approached decision-making process. Decision-making skills increased for participants. Youth who reported more learning as a result of intervention were more likely to have better outcomes in decision-making than those who reported after they participated in the intervention.

John Brown at the NMAH  
The National Museum of American History at the Smithsonian Institution created an immersive theater about John Brown that explores historical memory and reflection. An "Arbiter", or curator, explains the historical trail of John Brown to visitors. The museum can be a theater where the audience surrounds themselves in the story that involves a historical figure. Theater in museums can help "engage in public on the profound issues of national importance" of the complexity of history." Museums can use immersive techniques to allow audiences to feel like they are immersing themselves in someone's story, to create empathy towards others. Immersive museum exhibits submerge audiences into the story by not only looking at the exhibit but to also being a part of the exhibit and participating in the exhibit at the museum.

The Immersive Theater Bible: Definitive Edition 

This project involves what practitioners term an: experiential journal. A text (often hand written) that instructs a reader how to engage with an audience; the journal assumes that the reader is speaking to a group of people and directs its reader to engage them in certain activities and philosophies. The end goal being the reader and the listeners participate in a theatrical exchange giving way to the occasioned rumor that the ITB is a device used to instruct or create new immersive theater performers. The theory continues that anybody reading the ITB that can make sense of its text while keeping the interest of the audience is demonstrating the skills necessary to perform in immersive theater environments. Most contemporary practitioners of immersive theater have contributed to the ITB over the years and there is some discrepancy as to who authored the original work. This arises from the ITB mythos that whoever is reading the text also proclaims to have written it. Other stipulations include having to sell or gift the journal after a month of receiving it and allowing the current owner of the ITB to dictate the value of the journal based on their own experience.

RATS Theatre, Sweden
In 2008 RATS Theatre translated the play Antigone into an immersive radio drama to teach lessons in democracy and decision making to youths. Rats used computer technology to elicit feedback from the audience to improve future performances. Rats built two different theatres to hold their shows, one in Husby and the other in Kista (Both cities in Sweden). Husby is in a lower income area and Kista is in a higher income area, which helped them reach out to the youths of two completely different communities. This was important because they were able to use their program to help educate youths. All performances took place in an immigrant suburb, and the interactive decision making gave these students an important lesson in democracy—showing them the democratic process of public decision making.  In Husby, 84% of the inhabitants are either not born in Sweden or children of immigrant parents. Inputs from teens was optional but encouraged in order to get more information for the future productions. The RATS program has now expanded into Egypt, Libya and Tunisia. With the goal of helping teens getting involved in theatre can have their opinions help shape the future.

The mixture of interaction and the performance of the story triggers both emotional and cognitive feelings for young audiences. The ability to engage through text messages kept the audience involved while questions provoked deep thought. This cognitive process can improve lives. By the students learning how to use their opinions to shape performances they can also use their opinions to shape society. They can do this by voting in elections, becoming a teacher and most importantly working within the arts. All of these possible options would help continue to shape society in a positive way just as they did when they were motivated by the RATS program.

Punchdrunk

Punchdrunk is a British theatre company founded in 2000 by Felix Barrett. Their first production that same year was an adaptation of Georg Buchner's Woyzeck, set in an abandoned army barracks. This production set the precedent for future Punchdrunk shows, including the repurposing of large disused or abandoned spaces, the blending of various genres into a cohesive storyline, and allowing the audience the freedom to experience the production at their own pace while wearing specialized masks to encourage exploration and a loss of inhibition. Since then, Punchdrunk has staged many theatrical productions in a variety of locations, including adaptations of The Masque of the Red Death, The Cherry Orchard, Faust, and several different adaptations of Woyzeck. Notably, they have staged four separate productions of their award-winning adaptation of Macbeth, entitled Sleep No More, in 2003 in London, 2009 in Boston, 2011 in a permanent installation in New York City, and in 2016 in a permanent location in Shanghai through their International arm, in partnership with SMG Live. They also produced the limited television series The Third Day, and are currently in collaboration with augmented reality company Niantic to find ways to bridge the gap between live theatrical experiences and video games.

A Midnight Visit 
A Midnight Visit is an Australian interactive and immersive indoor theatrical experience based upon the works of Edgar Allan Poe, created by Broad Encounters Productions. Conceived and designed as a ‘choose-your-own-journey’, guests are invited to let their curiosity lead the way as they travel through a multi-room dreamscape filled with otherworldly characters and exquisite scenes.

David Byrne and Mala Goankar collaborations
In 2016, Mala Gaonkar and David Byrne created "Neurosociety", in which participants are guided through a series of experiences created in collaboration with working neuroscience labs. In 2022, they co-created "Theater of the Mind", loosely based on Byrne's life. The 75-minute production is led by various guides, all named "David Byrne", who take audiences through a journey of seven rooms, each one representing a stage of the artist's life.

PlayOn!
The Creative Europe programme of the European Commission's Culture segment co-sponsors the PlayOn! cooperative project. The project consists of nine theatres and eight universities working cooperatively "to understand, explore and apply immersive technology with storytelling to create new models of performance", during 2019 to 2023.

Future trends
Virtual reality in immersive theater consists of traditional story and filmic elements: plot, conflict, protagonist, antagonist. Virtual reality is a new way of establishing the protagonist. Users can customize the protagonist in detail and make the different decisions they think best for the plotline. Virtual reality in immersive storytelling enhances the message the author is trying to convey. VR uses lighting, dialogue, and positioning to immerse players. By being immersed, the player / protagonist undergoes two different types of goals, the external and internal. Virtual technology enhances the immersive theater setting, while staying true to aspects of original theater. The audience will experience the story as if they are a part of the story, following the main character or protagonist on a pathway to achieve their goal. The external goal is whether or not the protagonist physically finds a solution to their conflict while the internal goal is a goal within the protagonist's moral self and emotions.

Virtual reality allows viewers to become fully immersed into a traditional story world, immersing the audience into the storyline. When creating a story through the virtual reality experience, the viewer can change the plot, which usually begins through a traditional inciting incident or catalyst. Through metaphor, characters can illustrate to the audience the plot. Instead of verbally displaying this, it is displayed physically as well from facial expressions and actions. Symbolic objects are important representations used to advance the plot. Irony is displayed through external narrative (wants/desires) and internal narrative (needs). In VR storytelling, there can be many endings: positive ending, where the main character gets what they want and need; positive irony is when the main character gets what they need but not what they want; negative irony is when the character gets what they want but not what they need; a negative ending is the conclusion of a main character not getting what they want or need. As the viewer begins the VR story, the plot contains these traditional components: magical opportunity, test, enemy, a missing piece. A magical opportunity allows for the viewer in virtual reality to make choices about using magic in order to help them on their journey. The test challenges the viewer by threatening to take away a part of their identity.  The viewer must confront an enemy. The missing piece usually is depicted through a person as an obstacle. This is often correlated to a theme where the main character must realize that "missing pieces" are not objects that can be easily obtained. At the end of the story, the main character must renounce their magical abilities or magic.

The use of digital technology can create an experimental and immersive version of older plays, like the 16th-century Chinese play: "The Peony Pavilion." This immersive project, titled Inner Awareness: The Dream of Du Linang, conveys transcendent concepts to the audience using spatial relations dependent on the bodies of audience members by means of digital technology. Digital technology like motion tracking technologies, and computer-generated visual effects are used to immerse audiences. The purpose of using such technologies is to immerse the audience in the tactile sequences in the play, utilizing real actors in conjunction with motion tracking and mapping to generate a holographic effect, performing alongside the actors. This digital immersion seeks to recreate a classical Chinese garden as a space for the audience to walk around and experience the play. The spatial relations of the garden allow the audience to fill the void with subjective personal experiences and memory, creating a unique experience for each audience member. The recreation of the garden is digital, using real photographs of an actual garden serving as the basis and overlaying them with computer-generated effects. The digital immersive garden is a way to tell the story using the concept of space, which is intended to immerse the audience in the illusory nature of the play. In addition, the figure of each audience member will be traced and projected, creating personal interaction. The audience is encouraged to create movement for their digital bodies, which further immerses the audiencethey become part of the play.

Further use of this technology can be seen as in the modern movement to amalgamate the classics of yesteryear with modern virtual technology. Examples can be seen throughout modern western culture such as H. G Wells's 1897 serialized novel The War of The Worlds being adapted into the famous musical by Jeff Wayne. The latter has seen a dramatic transformation into an immersive experience implementing virtual reality, augmented reality, volumetric holograms, live actors all set to the score composed by Jeff Wayne and structured around the world created by H. G Wells. Companies such as Secret London and Dot Dot Dot are on the forefront of such technology and the latter devised this world around key points in London where the story line took place and puts the audience through a number of immersive experiences that play on their senses and sense of reality. The audience begins by arriving at London's Leadenhall Street where they quickly embark on a 60-minute immersive adventure through 22,000 square feet classic locations such as Horsell Common and Victorian London. The virtual experience serves as a revolution to modern theatre where the audience no longer remains as passive watchers in their favourite plays and novels but rather feels as though they were written into the story. By suspending their disbelief early on, participants are able to quickly immersive themselves into key points of the story by visiting iconic locations from The War of The Worlds such as The Observatory, Carrie's House, George's House, The Boat Ride and Brave London. The difference between this example and others is that this is a full immersive experience from start to finish. The interval that is required in shows of a certain length is starkly different to other immersive shows where the audience member would be pulled back to reality. Instead, when the interval arrives, members are taken to Red Weed Themed Bar with a 20-minute version of The Red Weed by Jeff Wayne performed exclusively during this time. From start to finish, the show employs a massive variety of devices to transform a normal immersive theatre experience into something much larger than life.

During the 2020 pandemic, immersive theater makers began using social virtual reality platforms as multi-user experiences for remote performance. The Finalist for the 2020 Producer Guild of America’s Innovation Award recognized live, virtual reality theater performances The Under Presents, Adventure Lab and Dr. Crumb’s School for Disobedient Pets, Ferryman Collective’s Krampusnacht in VRChat and Brendan Bradley’s Jettison in Mozilla Hubs. In 2021, a live performer XR community, OnBoardXR, supported dozens of web-based virtual reality immersive performances from all over the world. In 2021, Ferryman Collective, Meta Movie and Brendan Bradley were recognized for long running immersive theater works in live virtual reality.

Politics and theater 
In 1992 a local Brazilian theatre practitioner named Augusto Boal announced that he was running for the role of commissioner (mayor) and won the election using the slogan "Have the courage to be happy." Augusto employed five full-time actors and ten part-time actors to aid in his "street theatre style, which was based on the idea of providing interactive theatrical performances to the impoverished parts of Rio in an effort to convey political policies through the art of acting on a interpersonal level and to boost morale within poor neighborhoods through media that is very often unattainable to the general working class. "We use theatre to discuss problems of communities, workers, Blacks, women, street children, the unemployed, the homeless, etc. We don't want a passive audience, simply watching. We propose, on the contrary , that the public participate, interfere, enter on to the stage and propose alternatives for the plot: create a new story…Theatre is political and politics is theatre." Boal's stated goal was to use theater to change the political world, not to have the political world make him change. His idea of "legislative theatre" changed Brazilian political style, and would later become a style of art used internationally to advocate for social organizations.

Criticism 
Theatrical areas that are off-limits can add incentive for some audiences to explore. But, set designers often fail to plan for the possibilities and dangers of audiences going off-script to explore during performances. Audiences that participate in immersive theater are prohibited from entering restricted areas but the desire to go in a restricted area is not the failure of the audience's engagement, but an enhancement to the overall experience for immersive theater. Interacting with restricted areas can add a new perspective to immersive theatre. One example of restricted space is a performance conducted in various rooms at the Somerset House and King's College London. Audience members encountered a sign during the performance labeled, "DO NOT ENTER." It was clear that the performance prohibited any audience members from entering the room as it was not a part of the performance. Curious of what was beyond the restricted area, some entered the restricted area and wandered beyond the set play. The notion of audiences entering restricted areas contributes to interactive immersion because areas off limits contain a sense of mystery and wonder that set designers fail to plan; this impulse to explore arguably led to the birth of interactive and immersive theater. Restricted areas add a layer to the overall experience of an immersive theatre, but can also be dangerous and safety must be considered paramount. Some immersive theater designers incorporate audiences going safely off script into their work. Adventure 1, conducted by Coney, a British interactive and game-based theater, consists of audiences who record their adventure at St. Paul near the center of London. Participants are in an open and unrestricted set while wearing headphones that plays a fixed narrative. From there, audiences can travel anywhere.  Although the members of the theatre listen to direction, they can encounter various experiences beyond the script or role. This contributes to more experiences that set designers fail to plan in the original experience.

References 

Interactive media
Immersive entertainment